Janid Deraz (also Romanized as Janīd Derāz; also known as Gonbad Derāz and Gonbad-e Derāz) is a village in Sarjam Rural District, Ahmadabad District, Mashhad County, Razavi Khorasan Province, Iran. At the 2006 census, its population was 355, in 94 families.

References 

Populated places in Mashhad County